Statistics of the Scottish Football League in season 1996–97.

Scottish Premier Division

Scottish League Division One

Scottish League Division Two

Scottish League Division Three

See also
1996–97 in Scottish football

References

 
Scottish Football League seasons